Derek William Yalden (4 November 1940 – 5 February 2013) was an eminent British zoologist and academic. He was an Honorary Reader at the University of Manchester.

After obtaining a 1st Class B.Sc. University College London in 1962, he completed his PhD on carpal bones in mammals at Royal Holloway College, under Prof. P. M. Butler, in 1965.  He then worked as an Assistant Lecturer, and eventually Senior Lecturer, at the University of Manchester, School of Biological Sciences, teaching vertebrate zoology. He retired from there in 2005, after 40 years' service.

He was president of The Mammal Society from 1997 until his death, and edited their journal, Mammal Review from 1980–2002. He authored or co-authored over 200 scientific publications.

Leptopelis yaldeni, (grassland forest tree frog, named by M. Largen in 1977), and Desmomys yaldeni (Yalden's desmomys, a rodent named by L. Lavrenchenko in 2003) are named in his honour. Both are endemic to Ethiopia.

Derek Yalden Fund

An expert in the mammals of the UK and of Ethiopia, Yalden also took hundreds of students on field courses. To honour his memory, a fund has been set up to provide undergraduates from limited income families with financial support to help fund their field trips whilst studying at Manchester.

Research
Yalden listed his research interests as:
Cataloguing the mammal fauna of Ethiopia, with contributions to the Handbook of the Mammals of Africa
Conservation ecology of the Peak District, including:
Investigations of moorland erosion and restoration
Work on the ecology of golden plovers
Common sandpipers
Mountain hares
Red-necked wallabies.
History of Mammals and Birds in Britain
A project to compile a database of archaeological records of birds in Britain, funded by The Leverhulme Trust
Excavation (1966–90) of Foxhole Cave, in the Peak District, in conjunction with the Peakland Archaeological Society

Publications

Books 

Which Bat is it? by R. E. Stebbings, D. W. Yalden and J. S. Herman; 3rd ed. London: Mammal Society, c2007

Journal articles (selected) 
 Corbet, G.B. and D.W. Yalden. 1972. Recent records of mammals (other than bats) from Ethiopia. Bulletin of the British Museum (Natural History), Zoology 22: 213-252.
 "Bog Bilberry Vaccinium uliginosum in the Peak District". Sorby Record; 40: 28-29 (2001)
 "The older history of the White-tailed Eagle in Britain". British Birds; 100: 471–480. (2007)
 Pearce-Higgins JW, Finney SK, Yalden DW, Langston RHW (2007) "Testing the effects of recreational disturbance on two upland breeding waders". Ibis; 148 (Suppl 1): 45–55. (2007)

References 

British mammalogists
British ornithologists
Alumni of University College London
Academics of the University of Manchester
1940 births
2013 deaths
People from Surrey